Záluží is a municipality and village in Beroun District in the Central Bohemian Region of the Czech Republic. It has about 500 inhabitants.

History
The first written mention of Záluží is in a charter of King John of Bohemia and House of Zajíc of Valdek from 1331.

References

External links

Villages in the Beroun District